Castres may refer to:

 Castres, a commune in the Tarn department in the Midi-Pyrénées region
 Castres, Aisne, a commune in the Aisne department in the Picardy region
 Castres-Gironde, a commune in the Gironde department in the Aquitaine region
 Arrondissement of Castres, an arrondissement in the Tarn department in the Midi-Pyrénées region